Melissa Russo  (born November 19, 1968) is a television journalist currently working for WNBC-TV News Channel 4 in New York City.

She joined WNBC-TV in September 1998, where she is also a Government Affairs reporter. Previously, she was the co-anchor for the News 4 New York at the 6pm and 11pm Saturday newscasts.

She has worked several stories relating to purported problems with New York City and State agencies. In particular, she often reports on services provided to disadvantaged groups like senior citizens and the homeless. Russo was part of the team that launched a series of politics podcasts on WNBC in 2017.

Before joining WNBC-TV, she worked as a political reporter for NY1 News, where she began working in 1992 and was one host of that network's political interview show, Inside City Hall.

Russo graduated from The Dalton School in 1986 before attending Tufts University, where she received a bachelor's degree in Political Science in 1990. While there, she interned for The New York Times' editorial board, and continued her relationship with the Times by writing for the Op-Ed page, including one Op-Ed on a controversial free speech policy at Tufts that ultimately changed university policy.

References

 WNBC-TV biography
 "Daltonians talk politics at alumni fall event"
 Article concerning free speech at Tufts

1968 births
American women television journalists
Dalton School alumni
Living people
Tufts University School of Arts and Sciences alumni
Journalists from New York City